The GDT Speedster is a sports car. It was designed and built by a team of automotive professionals as an exercise in engineering and styling. The vehicle body panels are moulded fiberglass bonded to a steel support structure. The interior was also custom designed and built from scratch and features a unique instrument panel moulded in fiberglass and covered with leather. Custom gauges were fabricated and fitted to the instrument panel. The frame is fabricated from rectangular steel tubing and the underbody is steel sheet welded to the frame. It utilizes a drive train from a 1994 Corvette including the engine, automatic transmission, rear axle, steering, suspension and brakes.

More than 2,000 components were designed and fabricated to construct the vehicle and more than 13,000 total man-hours were devoted to the project.

The vehicle specifications are: 
 Overall length: 4110 mm (161.8 inches)
 Overall width: 1897 mm (74.6 inches)
 Overall height: 1068 mm (42.0 inches)
 Weight: 1471 kg (3244 lb)
 Engine power output: 224 kW (300 hp) at 5000 rpm.
 Estimated top speed: 273 km/h (170 mph).
 Engine: 5.7 liter, GM V8
 Transmission: 4 speed automatic RWD
 Maximum speed: 170 mph
 Horsepower: 300 bhp @ 5000 rpm

The project began in February 2000 and the vehicle was completed in November 2005. It was sold to noted collector of unique automobiles, John O'Quinn in February 2007.

References

External links 
 Product home page

One-off cars
Sports cars